Tani (also: Daragi) is a village and the center of Tani District, Khost Province, Afghanistan.

Climate
Tani has a cold semi-arid climate (Köppen climate classification: BSk) with hot summers and cool winters.

See also
 Khost Province

References

External links

Populated places in Khost Province